Jamesburg is an unincorporated community in Blount Township, Vermilion County, Illinois, United States.

Geography

References

Unincorporated communities in Illinois
Unincorporated communities in Vermilion County, Illinois